The American Deserters Committee (ADC) of Montreal, Quebec, Canada was a group of American Armed Forces members who deserted their posts and went to Canada to avoid the Vietnam War. The deserters were aided in their efforts by groups such as Students for a Democratic Society, the Black Panthers, the Revolutionary Union, The Resistance, American Friends Service Committee, War Resisters League and the Committee for Peace and Freedom.

ADC was formed by a group of politically active deserters, including Jerry Borstein and Bill Hertzog in December 1968, modeled on existing Deserters' Committees in Paris and Stockholm. ADC members included both deserters and their spouses and girlfriends, and welcomed other expatriate Americans who shared their views.  Though ADC retained almost total ideological independence, it received the bulk of its funds from the Montreal Council to Aid War Resisters (MCAWR), which, in turn, received most of its funds from the Canadian Council of Churches.

ADC operated a hostel for newly arrived deserters (sometimes housing up to 20 men at a time), and published a newsletter called ADC Times. By the early summer of 1970, friction within ADC began to emerge over the group's inner circle of founders and colleagues, who had begun calling themselves the "Central Committee." The Committee was seen by many as increasingly autocratic and undemocratic, adopting a radical, Marxist agenda, and discouraging dissent. In addition, it had allied itself with Quebec's separatist Front de Liberation Populaire (FLP), a nonviolent and implicitly Marxist organization, which campaigned for an independent and ideologically progressive Quebec. Though most ADC members were at least sympathetic to the FLP agenda, many feared that allying ADC (which had a few dozen members) with FLP (which had thousands of active supporters) benefitted neither group, while tarnishing the images of both.

In 1971, the ADC merged with the MCAWR, forming the American Refugee Service.

See also
 List of anti-war organizations

References

Anti–Vietnam War groups
Desertion
1968 establishments in Canada
Organizations established in 1968
1971 disestablishments in Canada
Organizations disestablished in 1971